Beauville may refer to:

 Beauville, Haute-Garonne, a commune in the department of Haute-Garonne in France
 Beauville, Lot-et-Garonne, a commune in the department of Lot-et-Garonne in France
 Chevrolet Beauville, a station wagon and later a van manufactured by General Motors
 The Beauvilles, an Ybor City-based Indie rock band.

See also
Biéville-Beuville, commune in the Calvados department